Smolnícka Huta is a village and municipality in the Gelnica District in the Košice Region of eastern Slovakia. Total municipality population was in 2011 486 inhabitants. It belonged to a German language island. The German population was expelled in 1945.

References

External links
 Official homepage
 Touristic page of Smolnícka Huta

Villages and municipalities in Gelnica District